Mad Tracks is a racing game. It was developed by Load Inc. for Microsoft Windows and was released in 2006. The Xbox 360 version was released on Xbox Live Arcade on May 30, 2007. This game is not to be confused with the similarly titled Mad Trax racing game released in 1998 and developed by Rayland Interactive.

Gameplay 
Mad Tracks has a single player mode and a multiplayer mode. In single player your objective is to achieve the highest trophy (Gold) by completing objectives, from racing around a track to landing your car on a face-down dart board.

Online mode 
In Mad Tracks online it is very similar to the single player. You can have up to 4 players in a single game and if you are the host you can choose the level you play at with the same objectives as single player. There is another feature allowing you to change the color of your car easily accessed by the Xbox 360 controller 'x' button, Allowing you to cycle through red, blue, yellow, green, purple, pink, black (Hajath)

Xbox 360 Downloadable Content
There are two content packages for Mad Tracks.
Each pack cost 350 MS pts, and added 15 challenges.

 Encore
Adds 10 races and 5 mini games
Release date: June 27, 2007
 Bravo
Release date July 25, 2007

Reception
IGN.com said, "A decent racing romp, but you better bring your friends." They awarded the game a score of 6.8 (Okay).

References

See also
Re-Volt
Things on Wheels

2006 video games
D3 Publisher games
Windows games
Neko Entertainment games
Racing video games
Toy cars and trucks
Xbox 360 Live Arcade games
Video games developed in France
Multiplayer and single-player video games